Kalkabrino is a ballet in three acts and three scenes, with choreography by Marius Petipa and music by Léon Minkus.

Première performance
The ballet was first presented by the Imperial Russian Ballet on 13 February 1891, on the Julian calendar (25 February 1891 in the Gregorian calendar) at the Imperial Mariinsky Theatre in Saint Petersburg, Russia.

Original cast
The principal dancers at the première were:

Carlotta Brianza — as Marietta/Draginiatza 
Enrico Cecchetti — as Reuben
Pavel Gerdt — as Kalkabrino 
Felix Kschessinsky — as René, Marietta's father
Nikolai Legat — as Olivier 
Marie Petipa — as Cigala.

Production notes
This work was not produced with the participation of Minkus, who had already retired to Vienna in 1886. Instead, the score was a pastiche of airs extracted from several ballets.

See also
Russian ballet

References

Ballets by Marius Petipa
Ballets by Ludwig Minkus
1891 ballet premieres
Ballets premiered at the Mariinsky Theatre